Expansions is the tenth album by jazz pianist McCoy Tyner and his fourth released on the Blue Note label. It was recorded in August 1968 and features performances by Tyner with trumpeter Woody Shaw, alto saxophonist Gary Bartz, tenor saxophonist Wayne Shorter, bassist Ron Carter (here playing cello), bassist Herbie Lewis and drummer Freddie Waits.

Reception

The AllMusic review by Scott Yanow stated: "The stimulating music falls between advanced hard bop and the avant-garde, pushing and pulling at the boundaries of modern mainstream jazz".

Track listing
All compositions by McCoy Tyner, except as indicated.
 "Vision" - 12:18
 "Song of Happiness" - 12:00
 "Smitty's Place" - 5:21
 "Peresina" - 10:21
 "I Thought I'd Let You Know" (Cal Massey) - 6:25

Personnel
McCoy Tyner – piano
Woody Shaw – trumpet
Gary Bartz – alto saxophone, wooden flute (on track 2)
Wayne Shorter – tenor saxophone, clarinet (on track 2)
Ron Carter – cello
Herbie Lewis – bass
Freddie Waits – drums

References

1970 albums
Blue Note Records albums
Post-bop albums
McCoy Tyner albums
Albums produced by Duke Pearson
Albums recorded at Van Gelder Studio